Robert Flowers could refer to: 

Robert B. Flowers, U.S. Army general
Robert C. Flowers (1917–1962), American football player
Robert Lee Flowers (1870–1951), American academic and former president of Duke University
Trey Flowers (Robert Lee Flowers III) (born 1993), American football player

See also
Robert Flower (1955–2014), Australian rules footballer